Simon Barnes is an English journalist.  He was Chief Sports Writer of The Times until 2014, and wrote a wildlife opinion column in the Saturday edition of the same newspaper. He has written three novels.

The son of Edward Barnes, a co-creator of the BBC children's TV programme Blue Peter, Barnes was educated at Emanuel School, and studied English literature at the University of Bristol, which awarded him an honorary doctorate in 2007.

After beginning his journalism career on local newspapers in Britain, he travelled to Hong Kong, where he wrote for travel magazines and, briefly, the South China Morning Post. After his return to Britain, he became a sports writer for The Times, being promoted in time to the position of Chief Sports Writer. He is the author of 16 books including three novels. His latest book, Birdwatching With your Eyes Closed: An Introduction to Birdsong, was published in 2011. Barnes has appeared in a number of programmes on BBC Radio 2, including a reading of his book How to Be a Bad Birdwatcher.

Barnes lives in Norfolk. He was on The Times team at the 2012 London Olympics, the seventh summer Games that he has covered for the newspaper.  In March 2009 he was runner-up in the Sports Journalists' Association's 'Sports Columnist of the Year' award, an award he won in 2008.

In June 2014 Barnes was sacked by The Times after 32 years' employment, the newspaper having informed him it could no longer afford to pay his salary. Speculation in some sections of the UK media was that the real reason may have been Barnes's outspoken views expressed in his wildlife opinion column. The column blamed illegal activity by red grouse shooting interests for the continued persecution and near extinction of the hen harrier in England. Writing in his new website and blog which he began after leaving The Times in 2014, Barnes wrote: "Certainly I have annoyed some powerful people."

Bibliography

,  winner of The Cricket Society/MCC Book of the Year

References

External links

 
 Bristol University profile

British male journalists
Living people
People educated at Emanuel School
Alumni of the University of Bristol
Year of birth missing (living people)